Grant Road (/graːnt/; station code: GTR), named after Sir Robert Grant, the Governor of Bombay between 1835 and 1839, is a railway station in South-Central Mumbai, and is the former terminus of the erstwhile Bombay Baroda and Central India Railway. The terminus was established in 1859 to connect to Surat, over the years the terminus facilities were moved to Bombay Central and facilities at Grant road were converted to cargo operations. Post independence the road which lends its name to the area and the station has been changed to Maulana Shaukatali Road

Overview

Towards the west of the Grant Road station is Nana Chowk (named after Jaganath Shunkerseth) and residential localities of Gamdevi, New Chikhal Wadi, Juni (Old) Chikhal Wadi, Bhaji Gully (the local vegetable market). To the east of Grant Road station is the retail electronic market of Bombay along Lamington Road. Grant Road station also connects famous Radha Gopinath Temple [ISKCON] at Chowpatty. Novelty cinema is at the junction of Grant Road with Lamington Road.

Famous places accessible to the West are Gowalia Tank (also known as August Kranti Maidan), Mani Bhavan at Gamdevi, Bhartiya Vidya Bhavan, Bhavan's College, Wilson College, Girgaum Chowpatty and Walkeshwar.
Famous places accessible from the East are Gol Deol off Duncan Road, Chor Bazaar on Mutton Street, Hurkisondas Hospital, Prathana Samaj, Badr Baug. 

For information on area, see Grant Road

Accessibility

Bus routes connecting Grant Road Station (West) include bus number 155. Bus number 155 is a ring route via Pedder Road.

See also 
 Gowalia Tank

References 

Railway stations in Mumbai City district
Mumbai Suburban Railway stations
Mumbai WR railway division
Railway stations in India opened in 1859